A general election was held in the U.S. state of Arkansas on November 3, 2020. To vote by mail, registered Arkansas voters had to request a ballot by October 27, 2020.

State offices

State Senate

17 out of 35 seats in the state Senate were up for election. Out of the contested seats, the Republican Party won 15 while the Democratic Party won 2. The resulting composition was 28 Republicans and 7 Democrats. Republicans gained the 12th and 26th district.

State House of Representatives

Federal offices

President and vice president of the United States

Arkansas had 6 electoral votes in the Electoral College. Donald Trump won all of them with 62% of the popular vote.

U.S. Senate

Incumbent Republican senator Tom Cotton won with 67% of the votes.

U.S. House of Representatives

Arkansas had 4 seats in the United States House of Representatives. The Republican Party won all of them. No seats changed hands.

Ballot Initiatives

Issue 1

Issue 2

Issue 3

Polling
Issue 1

Issue 2

Issue 3

Notes

See also
 Elections in Arkansas
 Politics of Arkansas
 Political party strength in Arkansas

References

External links
  (State affiliate of the U.S. League of Women Voters)
 
 
 
 

 
Arkansas